Milano Arena is a multi-purpose stadium in Kumanovo, North Macedonia. It is used mostly for football matches and is the home stadium of FK Milano Kumanovo.  It holds 3,500 people.

Football venues in North Macedonia
Multi-purpose stadiums in North Macedonia
Stadium
Stadium
Buildings and structures in Kumanovo
Sport in Kumanovo